Schutze Lake is a lake in Kenora District in northwestern Ontario, Canada. It was named after Luther Schuetze, who carved his name on a tamarack tree without the c and e because there was not room for them.

There are four unnamed creek inflows at the east, south and southwest. The primary outflow, at the west, is an unnamed creek to the Berens River, which flows into Lake Winnipeg. The lake is this part of the Hudson Bay and Nelson River drainage basins.

See also
List of lakes in Ontario

References

Lakes of Kenora District